Braysville is an unincorporated community in Harrison Township, Dearborn County, Indiana.

History
A post office was established at Braysville in 1853, and remained in operation until it was discontinued in 1861.

Geography

References

Unincorporated communities in Dearborn County, Indiana
Unincorporated communities in Indiana
1853 establishments in Indiana
Populated places established in 1853